Paolo Amodio (born 28 May 1973) is a Luxembourgish former football player and currently the manager of Differdange 03.

International career
He was a member of the Luxembourg national football team from 1996 to 1998.

References

External links

Paolo Amodio at Footballdatabase

1973 births
Living people
Luxembourgian people of Portuguese descent
Association football forwards
Luxembourgian footballers
Luxembourg international footballers
Jeunesse Esch players
FC Progrès Niederkorn players
FC Differdange 03 players
Luxembourg National Division players
Luxembourgian football managers
FC Differdange 03 managers
FC Progrès Niederkorn managers